Moscow Octod Tower is a  tall lattice tower in Moscow, Russia. The Moscow Octod Tower is a lattice tower used for FM- and TV-transmission in an unusual octagonal cross section, it is one of the tallest Hyperboloid structures in the world. Construction work on Moscow Octod Tower started in 2004. It was completed in 2006. The owner of the tower is the broadcasting company "Octod". The company and tower are situated on the territory of the former "October radio center." The  address is "Demyana Bednogo str. 24, Khoroshevo-Mnyovniki district," in the western part of Moscow.

Components were made completely of steel at a machine-building plant in Syzran. The lower sections of the Moscow Octod Tower were assembled using a crane; the top was lowered by helicopter Mil Mi-26TM.

Stations

Radio
FM stations that transmit from the Moscow Octod Tower include the following

See also 
 Lattice tower
 List of famous transmission sites

References

External links 
 http://www.octode.ru/ENGLISH/COMPANIA/news.htm

Towers completed in 2006
Communication towers in Russia
Towers in Moscow
2006 establishments in Russia
Lattice towers